Sir John Douglas Hazen,  (June 5, 1860 – December 27, 1937) was a politician in New Brunswick, Canada.

Biography 
Known by his second name, Douglas, he entered politics in 1885 when he was elected as an alderman for Fredericton City Council. He became mayor in 1888.

Hazen was elected to the House of Commons of Canada as a Conservative candidate in the 1891 federal election. He lost his seat in the 1896 election that defeated the Conservatives and brought Wilfrid Laurier's Liberals to power.

He was elected to the Legislative Assembly of New Brunswick in 1899, and became leader of the opposition. Hazen rebuilt the Conservative Party which had been out of power since 1883. He led the party into government in the 1908 provincial election.

As premier, Hazen fought political corruption and attempts by the federal government to reduce the Maritime provinces' representation in the federal House of Commons.

Douglas Hazen left provincial politics in 1911 to become federal Minister of Marine and Fisheries and Minister of the Naval Service in the government of Sir Robert Borden. During the First World War, he served in the Imperial War Cabinet. Hazen left politics in October 1917 to become Chief Justice of New Brunswick.

For his years of service to The Crown and to Canada, in 1918 Douglas Hazen was made a Knight Commander of the Order of St Michael and St George by King George V.

Hazen died in 1937 at age seventy-seven and was interred in the Fernhill Cemetery in Saint John, New Brunswick. Sir Douglas Hazen Park in Oromocto, New Brunswick and Sir Douglas Hazen Hall at the University of New Brunswick, Saint John are named in his honour.

Hazen was the father of King Hazen.

Electoral record

References

 
 Brief bio and fonds listing, UNB
 Biography, Government of New Brunswick
 http://www.biographi.ca/en/bio/hazen_john_douglas_16E.html

Further reading
 Arthur T. Doyle, Front Benches and Back Rooms: A story of corruption, muckraking, raw partisanship and political intrigue in New Brunswick, Toronto: Green Tree Publishing, 1976.

External links

1860 births
1937 deaths
Canadian Anglicans
Canadian Knights Commander of the Order of St Michael and St George
Conservative Party of Canada (1867–1942) MPs
Mayors of Fredericton
Members of the House of Commons of Canada from New Brunswick
Members of the King's Privy Council for Canada
Lawyers in New Brunswick
Fredericton city councillors
People from Sunbury County, New Brunswick
Premiers of New Brunswick
University of New Brunswick alumni